Malkot is a village of Abbottabad District in Khyber-Pakhtunkhwa province of Pakistan. Until the local government reforms of 2000 it was a  Union Councils of the district.

Location 

Malkot is located in the south-eastern part of Khyber-Pakhtunkhwa and forms part of the border with Punjab province (it borders the Murree Tehsil of Rawalpindi District). Neighbouring union councils are Nathia Gali to the west.

Climate 
Malkot is a mountainous area, with many pine, plum, orange and apple trees. Like Abbottabad District as a whole it has ideal climate conditions. Compared to the rest of the country, the summers are mild and pleasant and snow falls in winter.

References

Populated places in Abbottabad District